The Central Army Group (CENTAG) was a NATO military formation comprising four Army Corps from two NATO member nations comprising troops from Canada, West Germany and the United States. During the Cold War, CENTAG was NATO's forward defence in the southern half of the Federal Republic of Germany (FRG). The northern half of the FRG was defended by the four Army Corps of NATO's Northern Army Group (NORTHAG). During wartime, CENTAG would command four frontline corps (II German, III German, V US, and VII US). Air support was provided by Fourth Allied Tactical Air Force.

In addition to these forces, the French Forces in Germany (made up of the 1st Army Corps and 2nd Army Corps) were associated with the Army Group. In 1966, France had withdrawn from the NATO Command Structure, but it still wished to take part in the defence of Western Europe. A series of secret US-French agreements, the Lemnitzer-Ailleret Agreements, made between NATO's Supreme Allied Commander Europe (SACEUR) and the French Chief of the Defence Staff detailed how French forces would reintegrate into the NATO Command Structure in case of war. Three armored divisions of the First Army were based within Germany and held yearly maneuvers with their allies to train for the moment French units would be committed to CENTAG (see also: Structure of the French Army in 1989).

The estimated wartime structure of CENTAG in the fall of 1989 at the end of the Cold War follows below.

56th Field Artillery Command 
The 56th Field Artillery Command was organized to always report directly to the highest commander in Europe at the time. Therefore, during peacetime, it reported to the United States Army Europe, whereas, during heightened tension or war, command passed to NATO, with Allied Air Forces Central Europe as the next higher headquarters. The Pershing systems were eliminated after the ratification of the Intermediate-Range Nuclear Forces Treaty on 27 May 1988. The missiles began to be withdrawn in October 1988 and the last of the missiles were destroyed by the static burn of their motors and subsequently crushed in May 1991 at the Longhorn Army Ammunition Plant near Caddo Lake, Texas.

 56th Field Artillery Command, Schwäbisch Gmünd
 Headquarters & Headquarters Battery
 1st Battalion, 9th Field Artillery, Neu-Ulm, (36x Pershing II - converting to 27x M270 MLRS - inactivated 30 June 1991)
 2nd Battalion, 9th Field Artillery, Schwäbisch Gmünd, (36x Pershing II - inactivated 25 February 1991)
 4th Battalion, 9th Field Artillery, Neckarsulm, (36x Pershing II - inactivated 15 August 1990)
 2nd Battalion, 4th Infantry, Neu-Ulm
 38th Signal Battalion, Schwäbisch Gmünd
 55th Support Battalion, Neu-Ulm
 193rd Aviation Company, Göppingen, (8x UH-1H Iroquois)

HQ CENTAG 
 7th US Army HQ, Heidelberg, FRG
 1st Battalion, 10th Special Forces Group, Bad Tölz
 7th Support Command, Rheinberg
 3rd Battalion, 58th Aviation (Air Traffic Control), Schwäbisch Hall
 Company E, 58th Aviation (Air Traffic Control), Mannheim-Sandhofen
 207th Aviation Company, Heidelberg, (7x C-12, 10x UH-1H, 2x UH-60A)
 7th Army Training Command, Grafenwöhr, (3x UH-1H)
 7th Medical Command, Heidelberg
 30th Medical Group, Ludwigsburg, (Assigned to VII Corps)
 68th Medical Group, Wiesbaden, (Assigned to V Corps)
 421st Medical Evacuation Battalion, Nellingen-Stuttgart
 45th Medical Company, Nellingen-Stuttgart (15x UH-60A)
 159th Medical Company, Darmstadt (15x UH-60A)
 Det 1. Carl Schurz Kaserne, Bremerhaven 
 236th Medical Company, Landstuhl (15x UH-60A)
 Det 1. Grafenwöhr
 Det 2. Giebelstadt

18th Engineer Brigade 
 18th Engineer Brigade, Karlsruhe
 Headquarters and Headquarters Company
 79th Engineer Battalion, Karlsruhe, (8x M60 AVLB, 8x M728, 4x M88, 12x MAB bridge modules)
 94th Engineer Battalion, Darmstadt, (8x M60 AVLB, 8x M728, 4x M88, 12x MAB bridge modules)
 249th Engineer Battalion, Knielingen, (8x M60 AVLB, 8x M728, 4x M88, 12x MAB bridge modules)
 293rd Engineer Battalion, Baumholder, (8x M60 AVLB, 8x M728, 4x M88, 12x MAB bridge modules)
 649th Engineer Battalion (Topographic), Schwetzingen

32nd Army Air Defense Command 
The army's 32nd Army Air Defense Command fell operationally under Fourth Allied Tactical Air Force.

1st Canadian Division 
 1 Canadian Division (Forward)note 1, Canadian Forces Base Lahr, FRG
 4 Canadian Mechanized Brigade Group, CFB Lahr, FRG
 4 CMBG Headquarters & Signal Squadron, CFB Lahr
 8th Canadian Hussars (Princess Louise's), CFB Lahr (77x Leopard C1, 20x Lynx, 36x M113, 2x M577, 6x Bergepanzer)
 1er Battalion, Royal 22e Régiment, CFB Lahrnote 2
 3rd Battalion, Royal Canadian Regiment, CFB Baden-Söllingennote 2
 1st Regiment, Royal Canadian Horse Artillery, CFB Lahr, (2x M577, 26x M109A4, 46x M113, 24x M548
 4 Combat Engineer Regiment, CFB Lahr (2x M577, 9x Badger AEV, 14x M113, 6x M548, 6x Biber bridgelayer)
 444 Tactical Helicopter Squadron (detached from 1 Canadian Air Division), CFB Lahr (CH136 Kiowa, UH1N)
 4 Service Battalion, CFB Lahr (4x M113, 2x Bergepanzer, 6x MTV-R)
 4 Field Ambulance, CFB Lahr
 4 Military Police Platoon, CFB Lahr
 127 Air Defence Battery (detached from 4 Air Defence Regiment, Royal Regiment of Canadian Artillery), CFB Lahr (12x ADATS, 15x Javelin, 5x M113)
 5 Groupe-brigade mécanisé du Canada, CFB Valcartiernote 3
 5e GBMC Quartier général et escadron de transmissions
 12e Régiment blindé du Canada, (38x Cougar, 23x Lynx)
 2nd Battalion, Royal Canadian Regiment, (48x M113, 11x Lynx)
 2e Battalion, Royal 22e Régiment, (48x Grizzly, 11x Lynx)
 3e Battalion, Royal 22e Regiment, (48x Grizzly, 11x Lynx)
 5e Régiment d'artillerie légère du Canada, (2x M577, 25x M109A4, 46x M113, 24x M548)
 5e Régiment du génie de combat
 430e Escadron tactique d'hélicoptères, (CH136 Kiowa, UH1N)
 5 Service Battalion
 5 Field Ambulance
 5 Military Police Platoon

note 1: In case of war approximately 1,400 men from 1 Canadian Mechanized Brigade Group would have been sent to Germany to bring 4 Canadian Mechanized Brigade Group to full wartime strength.
note 2: Each of 4 Canadian Mechanized Brigade Group's mechanized battalions fielded the following equipment: 2x M577, 65x M113, 11x Lynx, 18x M113 TUA with TOW, 24x M125 with a 81mm mortar.
note 3: This brigade had formed the Canadian Air-Sea Transportable Brigade Group and would in wartime have supported NATO forces in Norway. In case of war, Canada thus would have had to support one brigade each in two far apart theatres of war. In 1987, the Canadian government therefore decided to make 5 Canadian Mechanized Brigade Group a wartime support for the German theatre, bringing its contribution there to division strength.

III German Corps 

 III German Corps, Koblenz
 Staff Company, III German Corps, Koblenz
 300th Long Range Reconnaissance Company, Diez
 300th Front Intelligence Company, Diez
 4x Field Replacement Battalions: 310th and 330th in Diez, 320th in Buch, 340th in Saarlouis
 3rd Artillery Command, Koblenz
 Staff Company, 3rd Artillery Command, Koblenz
 350th Rocket Artillery Battalion, Montabaur (6x Lance missile launcher)
 320th Nuclear Weapons Supply Battalion, Herborn
 300th Security Battalion, Giessen
 300th UAV Battery, Idar-Oberstein
 3rd Engineer Command, Koblenz
 Staff Company, 3rd Engineer Command, Koblenz
 310th Combat Engineer Battalion, Koblenz, (8x Biber AVLB, 8x Pionierpanzer 1, 4x Skorpion Mine Layers, 12x Floating Bridge Modules)
 320th Combat Engineer Battalion, Koblenz, (8x Biber AVLB, 8x Pionierpanzer 1, 4x Skorpion Mine Layers, 12x Floating Bridge Modules)
 330th Amphibious Engineer Battalion, Speyer
 340th Combat Engineer Battalion (Reserve), Emmerzhausen, (8x Biber AVLB, 8x Pionierpanzer 1, 4x Skorpion Mine Layers, 12x Floating Bridge Modules)
 350th Combat Engineer Battalion (Reserve), Stadtallendorf, (8x Biber AVLB, 8x Pionierpanzer 1, 4x Skorpion Mine Layers, 12x Floating Bridge Modules)
 360th Floating Bridge Battalion, Speyer
 310th NBC Defense Battalion (Reserve), Zweibrücken
 3rd Air Defense Command, Koblenz
 Staff Company, 3rd Air Defense Command, Koblenz
 300th Air Defense Regiment, Marburg (36x Roland missile systems mounted Marder 1)
 330th Air Defense Battalion (Reserve), Marburg, (24x Bofors 40L70)
 340th Air Defense Battalion (Reserve), Marburg, (24x Bofors 40L70)
 3rd Army Aviation Command, Mendig
 Staff Company, 3rd Army Aviation Command, Mendig, (15x BO-105M)
 30th Army Aviation Regiment, Niederstetten, (48x UH-1D, 5x Alouette II)
 35th Army Aviation Regiment, Mendig, (32x CH-53G, 5x Alouette II)
 36th Army Aviation Regiment, Fritzlar, (56x PAH-1, 5x Alouette II)
 300th Army Aviation Squadron (Reserve), Mendig
 3rd Signal Command, Koblenz
 Staff Company, 3rd Signal Command, Koblenz
 310th Signal Battalion, Koblenz
 320th Signal Battalion, Frankenberg
 330th Signal Battalion, Koblenz
 3rd Maintenance Command, Koblenz
 Staff Company, 3rd Maintenance Command, Koblenz
 310th Maintenance Battalion, Koblenz
 320th Maintenance Battalion, Koblenz
 330th Maintenance Battalion (Reserve), Koblenz
 3rd Supply Command, Diez
 Staff Company, 3rd Supply Command, Diez
 310th Supply Battalion, Diez
 370th Transport Battalion, Hermeskeil
 380th Transport Battalion, Buch
 3rd Medical Command, Koblenz
 Staff Company, 3rd Medical Command, Koblenz
 310th Medical Battalion (Reserve), Buch
 320th Medical Battalion (Reserve), Giessen
 330th Medical Transport Battalion, Wetzlar

2nd Panzergrenadier Division 
 2nd Panzergrenadier Division, Kassel
 Staff Company, 2nd Panzergrenadier Division, Kassel
 4th Panzergrenadier Brigade, Göttingen
 Staff Company, 4th Panzergrenadier Brigade, Göttingen, (8x M577, 8x Luchs)
 41st Panzergrenadier Battalion, Göttingen, (13x Leopard 1A1A1, 24x Marder, 12x M113)
 42nd Panzergrenadier Battalion, Kassel, (24x Marder, 6x Panzermörser, 23x M113)
 43rd Panzergrenadier Battalion, Göttingen, (24x Marder, 6x Panzermörser, 23x M113)
 44th Panzer Battalion, Göttingen (41x Leopard 1A1A1, 12x M113)
 45th Panzer Artillery Battalion, Göttingen, (18x M109A3G)
 40th Anti-Tank Company, Kassel, (12x Jaguar 2)
 40th Armored Engineer Company, Kassel
 40th Supply Company, Fuldatal
 40th Maintenance Company, Göttingen
 5th Panzergrenadier Brigade, Homberg
 Staff Company, 5th Panzergrenadier Brigade, Homberg, (8x M577, 8x Luchs)
 51st Panzergrenadier Battalion, Homberg, (13x Leopard 1A5, 24x Marder, 12x M113)
 52nd Panzergrenadier Battalion, Rotenburg an der Fulda, (24x Marder, 6x Panzermörser, 23x M113)
 53rd Panzergrenadier Battalion, Fritzlar, (24x Marder, 6x Panzermörser, 23x M113)
 54th Panzer Battalion, Hessisch Lichtenau, (41x Leopard 1A5, 12x M113)
 55th Panzer Artillery Battalion, Homberg, (18x M109A3G)
 50th Anti-Tank Company, Homberg, (12x Jaguar 2)
 50th Armored Engineer Company, Fritzlar
 50th Supply Company, Homberg
 50th Maintenance Company, Homberg
 6th Panzer Brigade, Hofgeismar
 Staff Company, 6th Panzer Brigade, Hofgeismar, (8x M577, 8x Luchs)
 61st Panzer Battalion, Arolsen, (28x Leopard 2A3, 11x Marder, 12x M113)
 62nd Panzergrenadier Battalion, Wolfhagen, (35x Marder, 6x Panzermörser, 12x M113)
 63rd Panzer Battalion, Arolsen, (41x Leopard 2A3, 12x M113)
 64th Panzer Battalion, Wolfhagen, (41x Leopard 2A3, 12x M113)
 65th Panzer Artillery Battalion, Arolsen, (18x M109A3G)
 60th Anti-Tank Company, Arolsen, (12x Jaguar 1)
 60th Armored Engineer Company, Münden
 60th Supply Company, Fuldatal
 60th Maintenance Company, Hofgeismar
 2nd Artillery Regiment, Kassel
 Staff Battery, 2nd Artillery Regiment, Kassel
 21st Field Artillery Battalion, Schwalmstadt, (18x M110A2, 18x FH-70)
 22nd Rocket Artillery Battalion, Schwalmstadt, (16x LARS, 16x MLRS)
 23rd Surveillance Battalion, Stadtallendorf, (12x CL-289)
 2nd Custodial Battery, Schwalmstadt
 2nd Armored Reconnaissance Battalion, Hessisch Lichtenau, (34x Leopard 1A1A1, 10x Luchs, 18x Fuchs - 9 of which carry a RASIT radar)
 2nd Air Defense Regiment, Kassel, (36x Gepard)
 2nd Engineer Battalion, Hann. Münden, (8x Biber AVLB, 8x Pionierpanzer 1, 4x Skorpion Mine Layers, 12x Floating Bridge Modules)
 2nd Army Aviation Squadron, Fritzlar, (10x Alouette II)
 2nd Signal Battalion, Kassel
 2nd Medical Battalion, Marburg
 2nd Supply Battalion, Kassel
 2nd Maintenance Battalion, Kassel
 5x Field Replacement Battalions: 21st and 22ndh in Ockershausen, 23rd in OArolsen, 24th in Wolfhagen, 25th in Fuldatal
 26th Jäger Battalion (Reserve), Wolfhagen
 27th Jäger Battalion (Reserve), Fuldatal
 28th Security Battalion (Reserve), Frankenberg

5th Panzer Division 

 5th Panzer Division, Diez
 Staff Company, 5th Panzer Division, Diez
 13th Panzergrenadier Brigade, Wetzlar
 Staff Company, 13th Panzergrenadier Brigade, Wetzlar, (8x M577, 8x Luchs)
 131st Panzergrenadier Battalion, Wetzlar, (13x Leopard 1A5, 24x Marder, 12x M113)
 132nd Panzergrenadier Battalion, Wetzlar, (24x Marder, 6x Panzermörser, 23x M113)
 133rd Panzergrenadier Battalion, Wetzlar, (24x Marder, 6x Panzermörser, 23x M113)
 134th Panzer Battalion, Wetzlar, (41x Leopard 1A5, 12x M113)
 135th Panzer Artillery Battalion, Wetzlar, (18x M109A3G)
 130th Anti-Tank Company, Sontra, (12x Jaguar 2)
 130th Armored Engineer Company, Wetzlar
 130th Supply Company, Wetzlar
 130th Maintenance Company, Wetzlar
 14th Panzer Brigade, Neustadt
 Staff Company, 14th Panzer Brigade, Neustadt, (8x M577, 8x Luchs)
 141st Panzer Battalion, Stadtallendorf, (28x Leopard 2A3, 11x Marder, 12x M113)
 142nd Panzergrenadier Battalion, Neustadt, (35x Marder, 6x Panzermörser, 12x M113)
 143rd Panzer Battalion, Stadtallendorf, (41x Leopard 2A3, 12x M113)
 144th Panzer Battalion, Stadtallendorf, (41x Leopard 2A3, 12x M113)
 145th Panzer Artillery Battalion, Stadtallendorf, (18x M109A3G)
 140th Anti-Tank Company, Stadtallendorf, (12x Jaguar 1)
 140th Armored Engineer Company, Stadtallendorf
 140th Supply Company, Neustadt
 140th Maintenance Company, Neustadt
 15th Panzer Brigade, Koblenz
 Staff Company, 15th Panzer Brigade, Koblenz, (8x M577, 8x Luchs)
 151st Panzer Battalion, Koblenz, (28x Leopard 2A3, 11x Marder, 12x M113)
 152nd Panzergrenadier Battalion, Schwarzenborn, (35x Marder, 6x Panzermörser, 12x M113)
 153rd Panzer Battalion, Koblenz, (41x Leopard 2A3, 12x M113)
 154th Panzer Battalion, Westerburg, (41x Leopard 2A3, 12x M113)
 155th Panzer Artillery Battalion, Lahnstein, (18x M109A3G)
 150th Anti-Tank Company, Westerburg, (12x Jaguar 1)
 150th Armored Engineer Company, Westerburg
 150th Supply Company, Rennerod
 150th Maintenance Company, Rennerod
 5th Artillery Regiment, Idar-Oberstein
 Staff Battery, 5th Artillery Regiment, Idar-Oberstein
 51st Field Artillery Battalion, Idar-Oberstein, (18x M110A2, 18x FH-70)
 52nd Rocket Artillery Battalion, Giessen, (16x LARS, 16x MLRS)
 53rd Surveillance Battalion, Idar-Oberstein (12x CL-289)
 5th Custodial Battery, Giessen
 5th Armored Reconnaissance Battalion, Sontra, (34x Leopard 1A1A1, 10x Luchs, 18x Fuchs - 9 of which carry a RASIT radar)
 5th Air Defense Regiment, Lorch, (36x Gepard)
 5th Engineer Battalion, Lahnstein, (8x Biber AVLB, 8x Pionierpanzer 1, 4x Skorpion Mine Layers, 12x Floating Bridge Modules)
 5th Army Aviation Squadron, Mendig, (10x Alouette II)
 5th Signal Battalion, Diez
 5th Medical Battalion, Rennerod
 5th Supply Battalion, Wetzlar
 5th Maintenance Battalion, Giessen
 4x Field Replacement Battalions: 51st in Lahnstein, 52nd in Diez, 53rd in Ockershausen, 54th in Stadtallendorf, 55th in Haiger
 56th Jäger Battalion (Reserve), Giessen
 57th Jäger Battalion (Reserve), Emmerzhausen
 58th Security Battalion (Reserve), Emmerzhausen

12th Panzer Division 
 12th Panzer Division, Veitshöchheim
 Staff Company, 12th Panzer Division, Veitshöchheim
 34th Panzer Brigade, Koblenz
 Staff Company, 34th Panzer Brigade, Koblenz, (8x M577, 8x Luchs)
 341st Panzer Battalion, Koblenz, (28x Leopard 2A1, 11x Marder, 12x M113)
 342nd Panzergrenadier Battalion, Koblenz, (35x Marder, 6x Panzermörser, 12x M113)
 343rd Panzer Battalion, Koblenz, (41x Leopard 2A1, 12x M113)
 344th Panzer Battalion, Koblenz, (41x Leopard 2A1, 12x M113)
 345th Panzer Artillery Battalion, Kusel, (18x M109A3G)
 340th Anti-Tank Company, Koblenz, (12x Jaguar 1)
 340th Armored Engineer Company, Koblenz
 340th Supply Company, Koblenz
 340th Maintenance Company, Koblenz
 35th Panzergrenadier Brigade, Hammelburg
 Staff Company, 35th Panzergrenadier Brigade, Hammelburg, (8x M577, 8x Luchs)
 351st Panzergrenadier Battalion, Hammelburg, (13x Leopard 1A5, 24x Marder, 12x M113)
 352nd Panzergrenadier Battalion, Mellrichstadt, (24x Marder, 6x Panzermörser, 23x M113)
 353rd Panzergrenadier Battalion, Hammelburg, (24x Marder, 6x Panzermörser, 23x M113)
 354th Panzer Battalion, Hammelburg, (41x Leopard 1A5, 12x M113)
 355th Panzer Artillery Battalion, Wildflecken, (18x M109A3G)
 350th Anti-Tank Company, Mellrichstadt, (12x Jaguar 2)
 350th Armored Engineer Company, Hammelburg
 350th Supply Company, Hammelburg
 350th Maintenance Company, Hammelburg
 36th Panzer Brigade, Bad Mergentheim
 Staff Company, 36th Panzer Brigade, Bad Mergentheim, (8x M577, 8x Luchs)
 361st Panzer Battalion, Külsheim, (28x Leopard 2A3, 11x Marder, 12x M113)
 362nd Panzergrenadier Battalion, Walldürn, (35x Marder, 6x Panzermörser, 12x M113)
 363rd Panzer Battalion, Külsheim, (41x Leopard 2A3, 12x M113)
 364th Panzer Battalion, Külsheim, (41x Leopard 2A3, 12x M113)
 365th Panzer Artillery Battalion, Walldürn, (18x M109A3G)
 360th Anti-Tank Company, Külsheim, (12x Jaguar 1)
 360th Armored Engineer Company, Bad Mergentheim
 360th Supply Company, Bad Mergentheim
 360th Maintenance Company, Bad Mergentheim
 12th Artillery Regiment, Tauberbischofsheim
 Staff Battery, 12th Artillery Regiment, Tauberbischofsheim
 121st Field Artillery Battalion, Tauberbischofsheim, (18x M110A2, 18x FH-70)
 122nd Rocket Artillery Battalion, Philippsburg, (16x LARS, 16x MLRS)
 123rd Surveillance Battalion, Tauberbischofsheim (12x CL-289)
 12th Custodial Battery, Philippsburg
 12th Armored Reconnaissance Battalion, Ebern, (34x Leopard 1A1A1, 10x Luchs, 18x Fuchs - 9 of which carry a RASIT radar)
 12th Air Defense Regiment, Hardheim, (36x Gepard)
 12th Engineer Battalion, Volkach, (8x Biber AVLB, 8x Pionierpanzer 1, 4x Skorpion Mine Layers, 12x Floating Bridge Modules)
 12th Army Aviation Squadron, Niederstetten, (10x Alouette II)
 12th Signal Battalion, Veitshöchheim
 12th Medical Battalion, Veitshöchheim
 12th Supply Battalion, Bad Mergentheim
 12th Maintenance Battalion, Tauberbischofsheim
 5x Field Replacement Battalions: 121st in Veitshöchheim, 122nd and 125th in Bad Mergentheim, 123rd in Koblenz, 124th in Hammelburg
 126th Jäger Battalion (Reserve), Walldürn
 127th Jäger Battalion (Reserve), Hammelburg
 128th Security Battalion (Reserve), Tauberbischofsheim

26th Airborne Brigade 
 26th Airborne Brigade, Saarlouis
 Staff Company, 26th Airborne Brigade, Lippstadt
 261st Airborne Battalion, Lebach
 262nd Airborne Battalion, Merzig
 263rd Airborne Battalion, Saarlouis
 264th Airborne Battalion (Reserve), Saarlouis
 260th Airborne Mortar Company, Lebach, (16x 120mm mortars)
 260th Airborne Engineer Company, Koblenz
 260th Airborne Medical Company, Lebach
 260th Airborne Logistics Company, Lebach

V US Corps 

 V Corps, Frankfurt
 Headquarters and Headquarters Company
 5th Personnel Group, Frankfurt
 5th Finance Group, Frankfurt
 493rd Army Band, Frankfurt
 4th Battalion, 2nd Air Defense Artillery, Giessen, (24x MIM-72 Chaparral, 27x M163 VADS Vulcan, 72x FIM-92 Stinger)
 12th Aviation Brigade, Wiesbaden
 Headquarters and Headquarters Company
 5th Squadron, 6th Cavalry (Attack), (18x AH-64, 13x OH-58C, 3x UH-60A)
 5th Battalion, 158th Aviation, Frankfurt-Bonames, (30x UH-60A, 30x OH-58D)
 6th Battalion, 229th Aviation, (18x AH-64, 13x OH-58C, 3x UH-60A)
 Company B, 6th Battalion, 158th Aviation, Mainz-Finthen, (16x CH-47D, 2x UH-1H)
 Company C, 7th Battalion, 158th Aviation (15x UH-60A)
 130th Engineer Brigade, Hanau
 Headquarters and Headquarters Company
 54th Engineer Battalion, (8x M60 AVLB, 8x M728, 4x M88, 12x MAB bridge modules)
 317th Engineer Battalion, (8x M60 AVLB, 8x M728, 4x M88, 12x MAB bridge modules)
 547th Engineer Battalion, (8x M60 AVLB, 8x M728, 4x M88, 12x MAB bridge modules)
 559th Engineer Battalion (Bridge)
 18th Military Police Brigade, Frankfurt
 Headquarters and Headquarters Company
 93rd Military Police Battalion, Frankfurt
 709th Military Police Battalion, Frankfurt
 22nd Signal Brigade (Corps), Frankfurt
 Headquarters and Headquarters Company
 17th Signal Battalion (Command Operations), Frankfurt
 32nd Signal Battalion (Corps Area), Frankfurt
 44th Signal Battalion (Corps Radio), Darmstadt
 205th Military Intelligence Brigade, Frankfurt
 Headquarters and Headquarters Detachment
 1st Military Intelligence Battalion (Aerial Exploitation), Wiesbaden, (6x RC-12D, 7x RV-1D, 8x OV-1D)
 165th Military Intelligence Battalion (Tactical Exploitation), Darmstadt
 302nd Military Intelligence Battalion (Operations), Frankfurt

3rd Armored Division 

 3rd Armored Division, Frankfurt
 Headquarters and Headquarters Company
 3rd Armored Division Band
 1st Brigade, Kirchgoens
 Headquarters and Headquarters Company
 2nd Battalion, 32nd Armor, (M1A1 Abrams)
 4th Battalion, 32nd Armor, (M1A1 Abrams)
 3rd Squadron, 5th Cavalry, (M2 Bradley)
 5th Squadron, 5th Cavalry, (M2 Bradley)
 2nd Brigade, Gelnhausen
 Headquarters and Headquarters Company
 3rd Squadron, 8th Cavalry, (M1A1 Abrams)
 4th Squadron, 8th Cavalry, (M1A1 Abrams)
 4th Battalion, 18th Infantry, (M2 Bradley)
 3rd Brigade, Friedberg
 Headquarters and Headquarters Company
 2nd Battalion, 67th Armor, (M1A1 Abrams)
 4th Battalion, 67th Armor, (M1A1 Abrams)
 5th Battalion, 18th Infantry, (M2 Bradley)
 4th Brigade (Aviation), Hanau
 Headquarters and Headquarters Company
 4th Squadron, 7th Cavalry, Büdingen, (40x M3A1 Bradley CFV, 10x M113, 6x M106A2, 4x M577, 8x AH-1F, 12x OH-58C, 2x UH-1H)
 2nd Battalion, 227th Aviation, (21x AH-1F, 13x OH-58C, 3x UH-60A)
 3rd Battalion, 227th Aviation, (21x AH-64A, 13x OH-58C, 3x UH-60A)
 Company G, 227th Aviation, (6x UH-1H, 6x OH-58A, 6x OH-58D, 3x EH-60A)
 Company H, 227th Aviation, (15x UH-60A)
 3rd Armored Division Artillery (DIVARTY), Hanau
 Headquarters and Headquarters Battery, Hanau
 2nd Battalion, 3rd Field Artillery, Kirch-Göns, (24x M109A3)
 2nd Battalion, 82nd Field Artillery, Friedberg, (24x M109A3)
 4th Battalion, 82nd Field Artillery, Hanau, (24x M109A3)
 Battery A, 40th Field Artillery, Hanau, (9x M270 MLRS)
 Battery F, 333rd Field Artillery, Hanau, (Target Acquisition)
 3rd Armored Division Support Command (DISCOM), Frankfurt
 Headquarters and Headquarters Company
 45th Support Battalion (Forward), Gelnhausen
 54th Support Battalion (Forward), Friedberg
 122nd Support Battalion (Main), Hanau
 503rd Support Battalion (Forward), Kirchgoens
 Company I, 227th Aviation, Hanau
 3rd Battalion, 5th Air Defense Artillery, Büdingen, (24x MIM-72 Chaparral, 27x M163 VADS Vulcan, 72x FIM-92 Stinger)
 23rd Engineer Battalion, Hanau, (8x M60 AVLB, 8x M728, 4x M88, 12x MAB bridge modules)
 143rd Signal Battalion, Frankfurt
 533rd Military Intelligence Battalion, Frankfurt, (Combat Electronic Warfare & Intelligence)
 503 Military Police Company
 22nd Chemical Company, Frankfurt

4th Infantry Division (Mechanized) 

 4th Infantry Division (Mechanized), Fort Carson, OPERATION REFORGER unit. POMCUS depots in Kaiserslautern.

8th Infantry Division (Mechanized) 

 8th Infantry Division (Mechanized), Bad Kreuznach
 Headquarters and Headquarters Company
 8th Infantry Division Band
 1st Brigade, Gonsenheim
 Headquarters and Headquarters Company
 4th Battalion, 34th Armor, (M1A1 Abrams)
 1st Battalion, 68th Armor, Wildflecken, (M1A1 Abrams)(Wildflecken)
 3rd Battalion, 8th Infantry, (M113)
 5th Battalion, 8th Infantry, (M113)
 2nd Brigade, Baumholder
 Headquarters and Headquarters Company
 2nd Battalion, 68th Armor, (M1A1 Abrams)
 3rd Battalion, 12th Infantry, (M113)
 4th Battalion, 12th Infantry, (M113)
 3rd Brigade, Mannheim
 Headquarters and Headquarters Company
 3rd Battalion, 77th Armor, (M1A1 Abrams)
 5th Battalion, 77th Armor, (M1A1 Abrams)
 4th Battalion, 8th Infantry, Sandhofen, (M113)
 4th Brigade (Aviation), Mainz-Finthen
 Headquarters and Headquarters Company
 3rd Squadron, 7th Cavalry, Sandhofen, (40x M3A1 Bradley CFV, 10x M113, 6x M106A2, 4x M577, 8x AH-1F, 12x OH-58C, 2x UH-1H)
 2nd Battalion, 4th Aviation, (21x AH-1F, 13x OH-58C, 3x UH-60A)
 3rd Battalion, 4th Aviation, (21x AH-1F, 13x OH-58C, 3x UH-60A)
 Company G, 4th Aviation, Bad Kreuznach, (6x UH-1H, 6x OH-58A, 6x OH-58D, 3x EH-60)
 Company H, 4th Aviation, Wiesbaden, (15x UH-60A)
 8th Infantry Division Artillery (DIVARTY), Baumholder
 Headquarters and Headquarters Battery
 2nd Battalion, 29th Field Artillery, Baumholder, (24x M109A3)
 4th Battalion, 29th Field Artillery, Baumholder, (24x M109A3)
 6th Battalion, 29th Field Artillery, Idar-Oberstein, (24x M109A3)
 Battery C, 16th Field Artillery, Baumholder, (9x M270 MLRS)
 Battery C, 333rd Field Artillery, Idar-Oberstein, (Target Acquisition)
 8th Infantry Division Support Command (DISCOM), Bad Kreuznach
 Headquarters and Headquarters Company
 118th Support Battalion (Forward), Mainz
 202nd Support Battalion (Forward), Mannheim
 208th Support Battalion (Forward), Baumholder
 708th Support Battalion (Main), Bad Kreuznach
 Company I, 4th Aviation, Mainz-Finthen
 5th Battalion, 3rd Air Defense Artillery, Wackernheim, (24x MIM-72 Chaparral, 27x M163 VADS Vulcan, 72x FIM-92 Stinger)
 12th Engineer Battalion, Dexheim, (8x M60 AVLB, 8x M728, 4x M88, 12x MAB bridge modules)
 8th Signal Battalion, Bad Kreuznach
 108th Military Intelligence Battalion, (Combat Electronic Warfare & Intelligence)
 8th Military Police Company
 25th Chemical Company

194th Armored Brigade 
 194th Armored Brigade, Fort Knox, KY, OPERATION REFORGER unit. POMCUS depots in Pirmasens
 Headquarters and Headquarters Company
 1st Battalion, 10th Cavalry, (M1 Abrams)
 2nd Battalion, 10th Cavalry, (M1 Abrams)
 4th Battalion, 15th Infantry, (M113)
 1st Battalion, 77th Field Artillery, (24x M109A3)
 75th Support Battalion (Forward)
 Troop D, 10th Cavalry, (9x M1 Abrams, 13x M3A1 Bradley CFV, 2x M113, 2x M106A2)
 522nd Engineer Company
 Air Defense Battery

197th Infantry Brigade (Mechanized) 
 197th Infantry Brigade (Mechanized), Fort Benning, GA, OPERATION REFORGER unit. POMCUS depots in Pirmasens
 Headquarters and Headquarters Company
 2nd Battalion, 69th Armor, (M60A3)
 1st Battalion, 18th Infantry, (M113)
 2nd Battalion, 18th Infantry, (M113)
 4th Battalion, 41st Field Artillery, (24x M109A3)
 197th Support Battalion (Forward)
 Troop D, 4th Cavalry, (9x M60A3, 15x M113, 2x M106A2)
 72nd Engineer Company
 Battery C, 5th Air Defense Artillery

11th Armored Cavalry 
 11th Armored Cavalry, Fulda
 Headquarters and Headquarters Troop, Fulda
 1-11th Armored Cavalry Squadron, Fulda, (43x M1A1 Abrams, 38x M3 Bradley, 12x M113, 6x M106, 4x M577, 8x M109)
 2-11th Armored Cavalry Squadron, Bad Kissingen, (43x M1A1 Abrams, 38x M3 Bradley, 12x M113, 6x M106, 4x M577, 8x M109)
 3-11th Armored Cavalry Squadron, Bad Hersfeld, (43x M1A1 Abrams, 38x M3 Bradley, 12x M113, 6x M106, 4x M577, 8x M109)
 4-11th Air Cavalry Squadron, Fulda, (26x AH-64A, 27x OH-58C, 18x UH-60A, 3x EH-60)
 Combat Support Squadron, Fulda, (Supply and Transportation Troop, Maintenance Troop, Medical Troop)
 58th Engineer Company
 511th Military Intelligence Company
 54th Chemical Company

V Corps Artillery 
 V Corps Artillery, Frankfurt
 Headquarters and Headquarters Battery
 41st Field Artillery Brigade, Babenhausen
 Headquarters and Headquarters Battery
 4th Battalion, 18th Field Artillery, Babenhausen, (24x M110A2)
 3rd Battalion, 20th Field Artillery, Hanau, (24x M109A3)
 1st Battalion, 27th Field Artillery, Babenhausen, (27x M270 MLRS)
 1st Battalion, 32nd Field Artillery, Hanau, (6x MGM-52 Lance, converting to M270 MLRS)
 4th Battalion, 77th Field Artillery, Babenhausen, (24x M110A2)
 42nd Field Artillery Brigade, Giessen
 Headquarters and Headquarters Battery
 5th Battalion, 3rd Field Artillery, Giessen, (24x M110A2)
 4th Battalion, 7th Field Artillery, Giessen, (24x M110A2)
 2nd Battalion, 20th Field Artillery, Hanau, (24x M110A2)
 2nd Battalion, 32nd Field Artillery, Giessen, (27x M270 MLRS)
 3rd Battalion, 32nd Field Artillery, Wiesbaden, (12x MGM-52 Lance, converting to M270 MLRS)

3rd Corps Support Command 
 3rd Corps Support Command, Wiesbaden
 Headquarters and Headquarters Company
 Special Troops Battalion, Wiesbaden
 8th Battalion, 158th Aviation (Maintenance), Erlensee
 15th Ordnance Battalion (Ammunition), Darmstadt
 181st Transportation Battalion, Mannheim
 16th Corps Support Group, Hanau
 Headquarters and Headquarters Company
 142nd Supply and Service Battalion, Wiesbaden
 8th Maintenance Battalion, Hanau
 19th Maintenance Battalion, Gießen
 85th Maintenance Battalion, Hanau
 68th Medical Group, Wiesbaden
 Headquarters and Headquarters Detachment
 7th Combat Support Hospital, Pirmasens
 12th Evacuation Hospital, Wiesbaden Air Base
 32nd Combat Support Hospital, Pirmasens
 557th Medical Company (Ambulance)
 583rd Medical Company (Ambulance)

VII US Corps 

 VII Corps, Stuttgart
 Headquarters and Headquarters Company
 7th Personnel Group, Nellingen auf den Fildern
 7th Finance Group, Stuttgart
 84th Army Band, Stuttgart
 5th Battalion, 2nd Air Defense Artillery, Crailsheim, (24x MIM-72 Chaparral, 27x M163 VADS Vulcan, 72x FIM-92 Stinger)
 11th Aviation Brigade, Illesheim
 Headquarters and Headquarters Company
 2nd Squadron, 6th Cavalry (Attack), (18x AH-64, 13x OH-58C, 3x UH-60A)
 4th Battalion, 159th Aviation, Stuttgart, (30x UH-60A, 15x OH-58D)
 4th Battalion, 229th Aviation, (18x AH-64, 13x OH-58C, 3x UH-60A)
 Company A, 5th Battalion, 159th Aviation, Schwäbisch Hall, (16x CH-47D, 2x UH-1H)
 Company C, 6th Battalion, 159th Aviation (15x UH-60A)
 7th Engineer Brigade, Kornwestheim
 Headquarters and Headquarters Company
 9th Engineer Battalion, Aschaffenburg, (8x M60 AVLB, 8x M728, 4x M88, 12x MAB bridge modules)
 78th Engineer Battalion, Ettlingen, (8x M60 AVLB, 8x M728, 4x M88, 12x MAB bridge modules)
 82nd Engineer Battalion, Bamberg, (8x M60 AVLB, 8x M728, 4x M88, 12x MAB bridge modules)
 237th Engineer Battalion, Heilbronn, (8x M60 AVLB, 8x M728, 4x M88, 12x MAB bridge modules)
 565th Engineer Battalion (Bridge), Karlsruhe
 14th Military Police Brigade, Kornwestheim
 Headquarters and Headquarters Company
 385th Military Police Battalion, Kornwestheim
 793rd Military Police Battalion, Fürth
 93rd Signal Brigade (Corps), Ludwigsburg
 Headquarters and Headquarters Company
 26th Signal Battalion (Corps Area), Heilbronn
 34th Signal Battalion (Corps Radio), Ludwigsburg
 51st Signal Battalion (Command Operations), Ludwigsburg
 207th Military Intelligence Brigade, Ludwigsburg
 Headquarters and Headquarters Detachment
 2nd Military Intelligence Battalion (Aerial Exploitation), Stuttgart (6x RC-12D, 7x RV-1D, 8x OV-1D)
 307th Military Intelligence Battalion (Operations), Ludwigsburg
 511th Military Intelligence Battalion (Tactical Exploitation), Ludwigsburg

1st Armored Division 

 1st Armored Division, Ansbach
 Headquarters and Headquarters Company
 1st Armored Division Band
 1st Brigade, Vilseck
 Headquarters and Headquarters Company
 1st Battalion, 37th Armor, (M1A1 Abrams)
 2nd Battalion, 37th Armor, (M1A1 Abrams)
 1st Battalion, 6th Infantry, (M113)
 2nd Brigade, Erlangen
 Headquarters and Headquarters Company
 2nd Battalion, 70th Armor, (M1A1 Abrams)
 4th Battalion, 70th Armor, (M1A1 Abrams)
 2nd Battalion, 6th Infantry, (M113)
 3rd Brigade, Bamberg
 Headquarters and Headquarters Company
 1st Battalion, 35th Armor, Erlangen (M1A1 Abrams)
 3rd Battalion, 35th Armor, (M1A1 Abrams)
 6th Battalion, 6th Infantry, (M113)
 7th Battalion, 6th Infantry, (M113)
 4th Brigade (Aviation), Katterbach
 Headquarters and Headquarters Company
 1st Squadron, 1st Cavalry, Katterbach, (40x M3A1 Bradley CFV, 10x M113, 6x M106A2, 4x M577, 8x AH-1F, 12x OH-58C, 2x UH-1H)
 2nd Battalion, 1st Aviation, (21x AH-1F, 13x OH-58C, 3x UH-60A)
 3rd Battalion, 1st Aviation, (18x AH-64A, 13x OH-58C, 3x UH-60A)
 Company G, 1st Aviation, (6x UH-1H, 6x OH-58A, 6x OH-58D, 3x EH-60)
 Company H, 1st Aviation, (15x UH-60A)
 1st Armored Division Artillery (DIVARTY), Zirndorf
 Headquarters and Headquarters Battery
 2nd Battalion, 1st Field Artillery, Zirndorf, (24x M109A3)
 3rd Battalion, 1st Field Artillery, Bamberg, (24x M109A3)
 6th Battalion, 1st Field Artillery, Zirndorf, (24x M109A3)
 Battery A, 94th Field Artillery, Erlangen, (9x M270 MLRS)
 Battery B, 25th Field Artillery, Grafenwöhr, (Target Acquisition)
 1st Armored Division Support Command (DISCOM), Fürth
 Headquarters and Headquarters Company
 47th Support Battalion (Forward), Erlangen
 123rd Support Battalion (Main), Fürth
 125th Support Battalion (Forward), Bamberg
 501st Support Battalion (Forward), Vilseck
 Company I, 1st Aviation, Katterbach
 6th Battalion, 3rd Air Defense Artillery, Schwabach, (24x MIM-72 Chaparral, 27x M163 VADS Vulcan, 72x FIM-92 Stinger)
 16th Engineer Battalion, Fürth, (8x M60 AVLB, 8x M728, 4x M88, 12x MAB bridge modules)
 141st Signal Battalion
 501st Military Intelligence Battalion, Ansbach, (Combat Electronic Warfare & Intelligence)
 69th Chemical Company, Katterbach
 501st Military Police Company, Katterbach

1st Infantry Division (Mechanized) 
 1st Infantry Division (Mechanized), Fort Riley, KS, OPERATION REFORGER unit. POMCUS depots in Mannheim.
 1st Infantry Division (Forward), Göppingen (Germany)
 Headquarters and Headquarters Company
 3rd Battalion, 34th Armor, Böblingen, (M1A1 Abrams)
 1st Battalion, 16th Infantry, Böblingen, (M113)
 4th Battalion, 16th Infantry, Göppingen (M113)
 2nd Battalion, 5th Field Artillery, (24x M109A3)
 299th Support Battalion
 Troop A, 1st Squadron, 4th Cavalry, (19x M3A1 Bradley CFV, 3x M113, 3x M106A2, 1x M577)(Boeblingen)
 Aviation Detachment, Göppingen, (2x UH-1H, 4x OH-58A)
 Company D, 1st Engineer Battalion
 Company D, 101st Military Intelligence Battalion
Other brigades, Division Support Command, etc.

3rd Infantry Division (Mechanized) 

 3rd Infantry Division (Mechanized), Würzburg
 Headquarters and Headquarters Company
 3rd Infantry Division Band
 1st Brigade, Schweinfurt
 Headquarters and Headquarters Company
 2nd Battalion, 64th Armor, (58 M1A1 Abrams)
 3rd Battalion, 64th Armor, (58 M1A1 Abrams)
 2nd Battalion, 15th Infantry, (58 M2 Bradley)
 5th Battalion, 15th Infantry, (58 M2 Bradley)
 2nd Brigade, Kitzingen
 Headquarters and Headquarters Company
 1st Battalion, 69th Armor, (58 M1A1 Abrams)
 4th Battalion, 69th Armor, (58 M1A1 Abrams)
 1st Battalion, 15th Infantry, (58 M2 Bradley)
 3rd Brigade, Aschaffenburg
 Headquarters and Headquarters Company
 4th Battalion, 66th Armor, (58 M1A1 Abrams)
 1st Battalion, 7th Infantry, (58 M2 Bradley)
 4th Battalion, 7th Infantry, (58 M2 Bradley)
 4th Brigade (Aviation), Giebelstadt
 Headquarters and Headquarters Company
 3rd Squadron, 4th Cavalry, Schweinfurt, (40x M3A1 Bradley CFV, 10x M113, 6x M106A2, 4x M577, 8x AH-1F, 12x OH-58C, 2x UH-1H)
 2nd Battalion, 3rd Aviation, (21x AH-1S, 13x OH-58C, 3x UH-60A)
 3rd Battalion, 3rd Aviation, (21x AH-1S, 13x OH-58C, 3x UH-60A)
 Company G, 3rd Aviation, (6x UH-1H, 6x OH-58A, 6x OH-58D, 3x EH-60)
 Company H, 3rd Aviation, (15x UH-60A)
 3rd Infantry Division Artillery (DIVARTY), Würzburg
 Headquarters and Headquarters Battery, Würzburg
 2nd Battalion, 41st Field Artillery, Bad Kissingen, (24x M109A3)
 5th Battalion, 41st Field Artillery, Schweinfurt, (24x M109A3)
 6th Battalion, 41st Field Artillery, Kitzingen, (24x M109A3)
 Battery C, 76th Field Artillery, Schweinfurt, (9x M270 MLRS)
 Battery A, 25th Field Artillery, Wertheim, (Target Acquisition)
 3rd Infantry Division Support Command (DISCOM), Würzburg
 Headquarters and Headquarters Company
 3rd Support Battalion (Forward), Schweinfurt
 26th Support Battalion (Forward), Aschaffenburg
 203rd Support Battalion (Forward), Kitzingen
 703rd Support Battalion (Main), Würzburg
 Company I, 3rd Aviation, Giebelstadt
 4th Battalion, 3rd Air Defense Artillery, Kitzingen, (24x MIM-72 Chaparral, 27x M163 VADS Vulcan, 72x FIM-92 Stinger)
 10th Engineer Battalion, Kitzingen, (8x M60 AVLB, 8x M728, 4x M88, 12x MAB bridge modules)
 123rd Signal Battalion, Würzburg
 103rd Military Intelligence Battalion, Würzburg, (Combat Electronic Warfare & Intelligence)
 3rd Military Police Company, Würzburg
 92nd Chemical Company, Giebelstadt

2nd Armored Cavalry 
 2n Armored Cavalry, Nuremberg
 Headquarters and Headquarters Troop, Nuremberg
 1-2nd Armored Cavalry Squadron, Bindlach, (43x M1A1 Abrams, 38x M3 Bradley, 12x M113, 6x M106A2, 4x M577, 8x M109A3)
 2-2nd Armored Cavalry Squadron, Bamberg, (43x M1A1 Abrams, 38x M3 Bradley, 12x M113, 6x M106A2, 4x M577, 8x M109A3)
 3-2nd Armored Cavalry Squadron, Amberg, (43x M1A1 Abrams, 38x M3 Bradley, 12x M113, 6x M106A2, 4x M577, 8x M109A3)
 4-2nd Air Cavalry Squadron, Feucht, (26x AH-1F, 27x OH-58D, 18x UH-60A, 3x EH-60)
 Combat Support Squadron, Nuremberg
 84th Engineer Company
 502nd Military Intelligence Company
 87th Chemical Company

VII Corps Artillery 
 VII Corps Artillery, Augsburg
 Headquarters and Headquarters Battery
 17th Field Artillery Brigade, Augsburg
 Headquarters and Headquarters Battery
 4th Battalion, 12th Field Artillery, Crailsheim, (6x MGM-52 Lance)
 1st Battalion, 18th Field Artillery, Augsburg, (24x M109A3)
 1st Battalion, 36th Field Artillery, Augsburg, (24x M110A2)
 2nd Battalion, 77th Field Artillery, Augsburg, (24x M110A2)
 72nd Field Artillery Brigade, Wertheim
 Headquarters and Headquarters Battery
 3rd Battalion, 12th Field Artillery, Aschaffenburg, (6x MGM-52 Lance)
 2nd Battalion, 14th Field Artillery, Bamberg, (24x M110A2)
 4th Battalion, 14th Field Artillery, Bamberg, (24x M110A2)
 4th Battalion, 27th Field Artillery, Wertheim, (27x M270 MLRS)
 3rd Battalion, 35th Field Artillery, Wertheim, (24x M110A2)
 210th Field Artillery Brigade, Herzogenaurach
 Headquarters and Headquarters Battery
 3rd Battalion, 5th Field Artillery, Nuremberg, (24x M110A2)
 2nd Battalion, 12th Field Artillery, Herzogenaurach, (6x MGM-52 Lance)
 3rd Battalion, 17th Field Artillery, Ansbach, (24x M109A3)
 5th Battalion, 17th Field Artillery, Herzogenaurach, (24x M109A3)

2nd Corps Support Command 
 2nd Corps Support Command, Nellingen auf den Fildern
 Headquarters and Headquarters Company
 Special Troops Battalion, Nellingen auf den Fildern
 4th Transportation Battalion, Ludwigsburg
 7th Battalion, 159th Aviation (Maintenance), Nellingen auf den Fildern
 101st Ordnance Battalion (Ammunition), Heilbronn
 7th Corps Support Group, Crailsheim
 Headquarters and Headquarters Company
 13th Supply and Service Battalion, Ludwigsburg
 1st Maintenance Battalion, Böblingen
 71st Maintenance Battalion, Fürth
 87th Maintenance Battalion, Wertheim
 30th Medical Group, Ludwigsburg
 Headquarters and Headquarters Detachment
 31st Combat Support Hospital, Nellingen auf den Fildern
 67th Evacuation Hospital, Würzburg
 128th Combat Support Hospital, Nellingen auf den Fildern
 42nd Medical Company (Ambulance)
 651st Medical Company (Ambulance)

II German Corps 

 II German Corps, Ulm
 Staff Company, II German Corps, Ulm
 200th Long Range Reconnaissance Company, Weingarten
 200th Front Intelligence Company, Nersingen
 4x Field Replacement Battalions: 210th in Dillingen, 220th in Engstingen, 230th in Weißenhorn, 240th in Calw
 2nd Artillery Command, Ulm
 Staff Company, 2nd Artillery Command, Ulm
 250th Rocket Artillery Battalion, Engstingen, (9x Lance missile launcher)
 220th Nuclear Weapons Supply Battalion, Günzburg
 200th Security Battalion, Engstingen
 200th UAV Battery, Munich, (16x CL-289)
 2nd Engineer Command, Ulm
 Staff Company, 2nd Engineer Command, Ulm
 210th Combat Engineer Battalion, Munich, (8x Biber AVLB, 8x Pionierpanzer 1, 4x Skorpion Mine Layers, 12x Floating Bridge Modules)
 220th Combat Engineer Battalion, Munich, (8x Biber AVLB, 8x Pionierpanzer 1, 4x Skorpion Mine Layers, 12x Floating Bridge Modules)
 230th Amphibious Engineer Battalion, Ingolstadt
 240th Combat Engineer Battalion, Passau, (8x Biber AVLB, 8x Pionierpanzer 1, 4x Skorpion Mine Layers, 12x Floating Bridge Modules)
 250th Combat Engineer Battalion (Reserve), Rainau, (8x Biber AVLB, 8x Pionierpanzer 1, 4x Skorpion Mine Layers, 12x Floating Bridge Modules)
 260th Floating Bridge Battalion (Reserve), Münchsmünster
 270th Floating Bridge Battalion (Reserve), Hemau
 210th NBC Defense Battalion (Reserve), Sonthofen
 2nd Air Defense Command, Ulm
 Staff Company, 2nd Air Defense Command, Ulm
 200th Air Defense Regiment, Munich (36x Roland missile systems mounted Marder 1)
 230th Air Defense Battalion (Reserve), Garching, (24x Bofors 40L70)
 240th Air Defense Battalion (Reserve), Garching, (24x Bofors 40L70)
 2nd Army Aviation Command, Laupheim
 Staff Company, 2nd Army Aviation Command, Laupheim, (15x BO-105M)
 20th Army Aviation Regiment, Neuhausen ob Eck, (48x UH-1D, 5x Alouette II)
 25th Army Aviation Regiment, Laupheim, (32x CH-53G, 5x Alouette II)
 26th Army Aviation Regiment, Roth, (56x PAH-1, 5x Alouette II)
 200th Army Aviation Squadron (Reserve), Laupheim
 2nd Signal Command, Ulm
 Staff Company, 2nd Signal Command, Ulm
 210th Signal Battalion, Dillingen
 220th Signal Battalion, Donauwörth
 230th Signal Battalion, Dillingen
 2nd Maintenance Command, Ulm
 Staff Company, 2nd Maintenance Command, Ulm
 210th Maintenance Battalion, Engstingen
 220th Maintenance Battalion, Ulm
 230th Maintenance Battalion (Reserve), Engstingen
 2nd Supply Command, Ulm
 Staff Company, 2nd Supply Command, Ulm
 210th Supply Battalion, Ulm
 270th Transport Battalion, Nuremberg
 280th Transport Battalion (Reserve), Fürth
 2nd Medical Command, Ulm
 Staff Company, 2nd Medical Command, Ulm
 210th Medical Battalion (Reserve), Münsingen
 220th Medical Battalion (Reserve), Sigmaringen
 230th Medical Transport Battalion (Reserve, staff active), Münsingen

4th Panzergrenadier Division 
 4th Panzergrenadier Division, Regensburg
 Staff Company, 4th Panzergrenadier Division, Regensburg
 10th Panzergrenadier Brigade, Weiden in der Oberpfalz
 Staff Company, 10th Panzergrenadier Brigade, Weiden in der Oberpfalz, (8x M577, 8x Luchs)
 101st Panzergrenadier Battalion, Weiden in der Oberpfalz, (13x Leopard 1A1A1, 24x Marder, 12x M113)
 102nd Panzergrenadier Battalion, Bayreuth, (24x Marder, 6x Panzermörser, 23x M113)
 103rd Panzergrenadier Battalion, Ebern, (24x Marder, 6x Panzermörser, 23x M113)
 104th Panzer Battalion, Pfreimd, (41x Leopard 1A1A1, 12x M113)
 105th Panzer Artillery Battalion, Weiden in der Oberpfalz, (18x M109A3G)
 100th Anti-Tank Company, Pfreimd, (12x Jaguar 2)
 100th Armored Engineer Company, Weiden in der Oberpfalz
 100th Supply Company, Weiden in der Oberpfalz
 100th Maintenance Company, Pfreimd
 11th Panzergrenadier Brigade, Bogen
 Staff Company, 11th Panzergrenadier Brigade, Bogen, (8x M577, 8x Luchs)
 111th Panzergrenadier Battalion, Bogen, (13x Leopard 1A1A1, 24x Marder, 12x M113)
 112th Panzergrenadier Battalion, Regen, (24x Marder, 6x Panzermörser, 23x M113)
 113th Panzergrenadier Battalion, Cham, (24x Marder, 6x Panzermörser, 23x M113)
 114th Panzer Battalion, Neunburg vorm Wald, (41x Leopard 1A1A1, 12x M113)
 115th Panzer Artillery Battalion, Neunburg vorm Wald, (18x M119A3G)
 110th Anti-Tank Company, Neunburg vorm Wald, (12x Jaguar 2)
 110th Armored Engineer Company, Bogen
 110th Supply Company, Roding
 110th Maintenance Company, Roding
 12th Panzer Brigade, Amberg
 Staff Company, 12th Panzer Brigade, Amberg, (8x M577, 8x Luchs)
 121st Panzer Battalion, Kümmersbruck, (28x Leopard 2A1, 11x Marder, 12x M113)
 122nd Panzergrenadier Battalion, Oberviechtach, (35x Marder, 6x Panzermörser, 12x M113)
 123rd Panzer Battalion, Kümmersbruck, (41x Leopard 2A1, 12x M113)
 124th Panzer Battalion, Kümmersbruck, (41x Leopard 2A1, 12x M113)
 125th Panzer Artillery Battalion, Bayreuth, (18x M109A3G)
 120th Anti-Tank Company, Oberviechtach (12x Jaguar 1)
 120th Armored Engineer Company, Kümmersbruck
 120th Supply Company, Amberg
 120th Maintenance Company, Amberg
 4th Artillery Regiment, Regensburg
 Staff Battery, 4th Artillery Regiment, Regensburg
 41st Field Artillery Battalion, Regensburg, (18x M110A2, 18x FH-70)
 42nd Rocket Artillery Battalion, Hemau, (16x LARS, 16x MLRS)
 43rd Surveillance Battalion, Amberg (12x CL-289)
 4th Custodial Battery, Hemau
 4th Armored Reconnaissance Battalion, Roding, (34x Leopard 1A1A1, 10x Luchs, 18x Fuchs - 9 of which carry a RASIT radar)
 4th Air Defense Regiment, Regensburg, (36x Gepard)
 4th Engineer Battalion, Bogen, (8x Biber AVLB, 8x Pionierpanzer 1, 4x Skorpion Mine Layers, 12x Floating Bridge Modules)
 4th Army Aviation Squadron, Feldkirchen, (10x BO-105M)
 4th Signal Battalion, Regensburg
 4th Medical Battalion, Regensburg
 4th Supply Battalion, Regensburg
 4th Maintenance Battalion, Regensburg
 5x Field Replacement Battalions: 41st in Regensburg, 42nd in Münchsmünster, 43rd in Roth, 44th in Feldkirchen, 45th in Amberg
 46th Jäger Battalion (Reserve), Hemau
 47th Jäger Battalion (Reserve), Feldkirchen
 48th Security Battalion (Reserve), Amberg

1st Mountain Division 
 1st Mountain Division, Garmisch-Partenkirchen (note: the 1st Mountain Division was the 8th division raised by the Bundeswehr)
 Staff Company, 1st Mountain Division, Garmisch-Partenkirchen
 22nd Panzergrenadier Brigade, Murnau am Staffelsee
 Staff Company, 22nd Panzergrenadier Brigade, Murnau am Staffelsee, (8x M577, 8x Luchs)
 221st Panzergrenadier Battalion, Murnau am Staffelsee, (13x Leopard 1A5, 24x Marder, 12x M113)
 222nd Panzergrenadier Battalion, Murnau am Staffelsee, (35x Marder, 6x Panzermörser, 12x M113)
 223rd Panzergrenadier Battalion, Munich, (35x Marder, 6x Panzermörser, 12x M113)
 224th Panzer Battalion, Landsberg am Lech, (41x Leopard 1A5, 12x M113)
 225th Panzer Artillery Battalion, Füssen, (18x M109A3G)
 220th Anti-Tank Company, Feldkirchen, (12x Jaguar 2)
 220th Armored Engineer Company, Brannenburg
 220th Supply Company, Füssen
 220th Maintenance Company, Füssen
 23rd Gebirgsjäger Brigade, Bad Reichenhall
 Staff Company, 23rd Gebirgsjäger Brigade, Bad Reichenhall
 231st Gebirgsjäger Battalion, Bad Reichenhall
 232nd Gebirgsjäger Battalion, Bischofswiesen
 233rd Gebirgsjäger Battalion, Mittenwald
 234th Gebirgsjäger Battalion, Mittenwald
 235th Panzer Artillery Battalion, Bad Reichenhall, (18x FH70)
 230th Anti-Tank Company, Landsberg am Lech, (12x Leopard 1A1A1)
 230th Armored Engineer Company, Brannenburg
 230th Supply Company, Bad Reichenhall
 230th Mountain Pack Animal Company, Bad Reichenhall, (54x Haflinger packhorses)
 230th Mountain NBC Defense Company, Bad Reichenhall
 24th Panzer Brigade, Landshut
 Staff Company, 24th Panzer Brigade, Landshut, (8x M577, 8x Luchs)
 241st Panzer Battalion, Landshut, (28x Leopard 2A1, 11x Marder, 12x M113)
 242nd Panzergrenadier Battalion, Feldkirchen, (35x Marder, 6x Panzermörser, 12x M113)
 243rd Panzer Battalion, Kirchham, (41x Leopard 2A1, 12x M113)
 244th Panzer Battalion, Landshut, (41x Leopard 2A1, 12x M113)
 245th Panzer Artillery Battalion, Landshut, (18x M109A3G)
 240th Anti-Tank Company, Feldkirchen, (12x Jaguar 1)
 240th Armored Engineer Company, Feldkirchen
 240th Supply Company, Feldkirchen
 240th Maintenance Company, Feldkirchen
 56th Home Defense Brigade, Oberhausen (originally a brigade of the Territorial Army; it was partially activated and staffed in 1982 and subordinated to the 1st Mountain Division as reinforcement in 1985)
 Staff Company, 56th Home Defense Brigade, Oberhausen, (8x M577, 8x Luchs)
 561st Panzergrenadier Battalion, Munich, (24x Marder, 6x Panzermörser, 23x M113)
 562nd Panzergrenadier Battalion, Oberhausen, (24x Marder, 6x Panzermörser, 23x M113)
 563rd Panzer Battalion, Landshut, (41x Leopard 1A1A1, 12x M113)
 564th Panzer Battalion, Landshut, (41x Leopard 1A1A1, 12x M113)
 565th Panzer Artillery Battalion, Munich, (18x M109A2)
 567th Field Replacement Battalion, Landshut
 560th Anti-Tank Company, Bogen, (12x Jaguar 1)
 560th Armored Engineer Company, Munich
 560th Medical Company, Garching
 560th Supply Company, Munich
 560th Maintenance Company, Munich
 8th Artillery Regiment, Landsberg am Lech
 Staff Battery, 8th Artillery Regiment, Landsberg am Lech
 81st Field Artillery Battalion, Kempten, (24x M110A2)
 82nd Rocket Artillery Battalion, Landsberg am Lech, (16x LARS, 16x MLRS)
 83rd Surveillance Battalion, Landsberg am Lech (12x CL-289)
 8th Custodial Battery, Landsberg am Lech
 8th Mountain Armored Reconnaissance Battalion, Freyung, (38x Leopard 1A5, 10x Luchs, 18x Fuchs - 9 of which carry a RASIT radar)
 8th Mountain Panzer Battalion, Kirchham, (54x Leopard 1A1A1, 5x M113)
 8th Mountain Air Defense Regiment, Traunstein, (36x Gepard)
 8th Mountain Engineer Battalion, Brannenburg, (8x Biber AVLB, 8x Pionierpanzer 1, 4x Skorpion Mine Layers, 12x Floating Bridge Modules)
 8th Mountain Army Aviation Squadron, Penzing, (10x BO-105M)
 8th Mountain Signal Battalion, Murnau am Staffelsee
 8th Mountain Medical Battalion, Kempten
 8th Mountain Supply Battalion, Mittenwald
 8th Mountain Maintenance Battalion, Sonthofen
 5x Mountain Field Replacement Battalions: 81st in Mittenwald, 82nd in Bad Tölz, 83rd in Kempten, 84th in Bruckmühl, 85th in Landshut
 86th Gebirgsjäger Battalion (Reserve), Landsberg am Lech
 87th Gebirgsjäger Battalion (Reserve), Bruckmühl
 88th Mountain Security Battalion (Reserve), Bad Tölz

10th Panzer Division 
 10th Panzer Division, Sigmaringen
 Staff Company, 10th Panzer Division, Sigmaringen
 28th Panzer Brigade, Dornstadt
 Staff Company, 28th Panzer Brigade, Dornstadt, (8x M577, 8x Luchs)
 281st Panzer Battalion, Dornstadt, (28x Leopard 2A4, 11x Marder, 12x M113)
 282nd Panzergrenadier Battalion, Dornstadt, (35x Marder, 6x Panzermörser, 12x M113)
 283rd Panzer Battalion, Münsingen, (41x Leopard 2A4, 12x M113)
 284th Panzer Battalion, Dornstadt, (41x Leopard 2A4, 12x M113)
 285th Panzer Artillery Battalion, Münsingen, (18x M109A3G)
 280th Anti-Tank Company, Dornstadt, (12x Jaguar 1)
 280th Armored Engineer Company, Ingolstadt
 280th Supply Company, Dornstadt
 280th Maintenance Company, Dornstadt
 29th Panzer Brigade, Sigmaringen
 Staff Company, 29th Panzer Brigade, Sigmaringen, (8x M577, 8x Luchs)
 291st Panzer Battalion, Stetten am kalten Markt, (28x Leopard 2A4, 11x Marder, 12x M113)
 292nd Panzergrenadier Battalion, Immendingen, (35x Marder, 6x Panzermörser, 12x M113)
 293rd Panzer Battalion, Stetten am kalten Markt, (41x Leopard 2A4, 12x M113)
 294th Panzer Battalion, Stetten am kalten Markt, (41x Leopard 2A4, 12x M113)
 295th Panzer Artillery Battalion, Immendingen, (18x M109A3G)
 290th Anti-Tank Company, Stetten am kalten Markt, (12x Jaguar 1)
 290th Armored Engineer Company, Immendingen
 290th Supply Company, Stetten am kalten Markt
 290th Maintenance Company, Stetten am kalten Markt
 30th Panzergrenadier Brigade, Ellwangen an der Jagst
 Staff Company, 30th Panzergrenadier Brigade, Ellwangen an der Jagst, (8x M577, 8x Luchs)
 301st Panzergrenadier Battalion, Ellwangen an der Jagst, (13x Leopard 2A4, 24x Marder, 13x M113)
 302nd Panzergrenadier Battalion, Ellwangen an der Jagst, (24x Marder, 6x Panzermörser, 23x M113)
 303rd Panzergrenadier Battalion (Reserve, staff active), Ellwangen an der Jagst, (24x Marder, 6x Panzermörser, 23x M113)
 304th Panzer Battalion, Heidenheim an der Brenz, (41x Leopard 2A4, 12x M113)
 305th Panzer Artillery Battalion, Donauwörth, (18x M309A3G)
 300th Anti-Tank Company, Ellwangen an der Jagst, (12x Jaguar 2)
 300th Armored Engineer Company, Ellwangen an der Jagst
 300th Supply Company, Ellwangen an der Jagst
 300th Maintenance Company, Ellwangen an der Jagst
 10th Artillery Regiment, Pfullendorf
 Staff Battery, 10th Artillery Regiment, Pfullendorf
 101st Field Artillery Battalion, Pfullendorf, (18x M110A2, 18x FH-70)
 102nd Rocket Artillery Battalion, Pfullendorf, (16x LARS, 16x MLRS)
 103rd Surveillance Battalion, Pfullendorf (12x CL-289)
 10th Custodial Battery, Pfullendorf
 10th Armored Reconnaissance Battalion, Ingolstadt, (34x Leopard 1A3, 10x Luchs, 18x Fuchs - 9 of which carry a RASIT radar)
 10th Air Defense Regiment, Sigmaringen, (36x Gepard)
 10th Engineer Battalion, Ingolstadt, (8x Biber AVLB, 8x Pionierpanzer 1, 4x Skorpion Mine Layers, 10x Floating Bridge Modules)
 10th Army Aviation Squadron, Neuhausen ob Eck, (10x BO-105M)
 10th Signal Battalion, Horb am Neckar
 10th Medical Battalion, Veitshöchheim
 10th Supply Battalion, Ellwangen an der Jagst
 10th Maintenance Battalion, Sigmaringen
 5x Field Replacement Battalions: 101st, 103rd and 104th in Sigmaringen, 102nd in Pfullendorf, 105th in Rainau,
 106th Jäger Battalion (Reserve), Amstetten
 107th Jäger Battalion (Reserve), Hammelburg
 108th Security Battalion (Reserve), Münchsmünster

25th Airborne Brigade 
 25th Airborne Brigade, Calw
 Staff Company, 25th Airborne Brigade, Calw
 251st Airborne Battalion, Calw
 252nd Airborne Battalion, Nagold
 253rd Airborne Battalion, Nagold
 254th Airborne Battalion (Reserve), Calw
 250th Airborne Mortar Company, Calw, (16x 120mm mortars)
 250th Airborne Engineer Company, Passau
 250th Airborne Medical Company, Calw
 250th Airborne Logistics Company, Calw

21st Theater Army Area Command 
 21st Theater Army Area Command, Kaiserslautern
 Headquarters and Headquarters Company
 70th Transportation Battalion (Aviation Intermediate Maintenance), Mannheim
 95th Military Police Battalion, Mannheim
 21st Personnel Group, Kaiserslautern
 21st Finance Group, Kaiserslautern
 76th Army Band, Kaiserslautern
 4th Transportation Command, Oberursel
 Headquarters and Headquarters Company
 570th Military Police Platoon (Railway Guard)
 Company D, 502nd Aviation Regiment, Mannheim (1x UH-1H Iroquois, 16x CH-47D Chinook)
 1st Transportation Movement Control Agency, Oberursel
 Headquarters and Headquarters Company
 14th Transportation Battalion (Movement Control), Vicenza
 27th Transportation Battalion (Movement Control), Bremerhaven
 39th Transportation Battalion (Movement Control), Kaiserslautern
 37th Transportation Group, Kaiserslautern
 Headquarters and Headquarters Detachment
 4th Transportation Battalion, Ludwigsburg
 28th Transportation Battalion, Mannheim
 53rd Transportation Battalion, Kaiserslautern
 106th Transportation Battalion, Rüsselsheim
 181st Transportation Battalion, Mannheim
 U.S. Army Combat Equipment Group, Europe, Mannheim, maintains the REFORGER POMCUS depots:
 Headquarters and Headquarters Company
 Combat Equipment Battalion East, Karlsruhe, maintains the 1st Infantry Division (Mechanized) POMCUS depots
 Combat Equipment Battalion West, Landstuhl, maintains the 4th Infantry Division (Mechanized), 194th Armored Brigade and 197th Infantry Brigade (Mechanized) POMCUS depots
 Combat Equipment Battalion North, Mönchengladbach, maintains the 1st Cavalry Division, 2nd Armored Division, 3rd Armored Cavalry, and 212th Field Artillery Brigade POMCUS depots
 Combat Equipment Battalion Northwest, Coevorden (Netherlands), maintains the 5th Infantry Division (Mechanized) POMCUS depots

59th Ordnance Brigade, circa 1990 
 59th Ordnance Brigade, Pirmasens, responsible for storage, delivering, and maintaining nuclear and chemical weapons of mass destruction for U.S. forces and shared with allied NATO forces:
 Headquarters Support Battalion, 59th Ordnance Brigade – Pirmasens (GE), Husterhoeh Kaserne
 3rd Ordnance Battalion, Münchweiler an der Rodalb
 72nd Ordnance Battalion, Bruchmühlbach-Miesau
 197th Ordnance Battalion, Münchweiler an der Rodalb
 294th U.S. Army Artillery Group, Flensburg
 512th U.S. Army Artillery Group, Günzburg
 552nd U.S. Army Artillery Group, Sögel
 557th U.S. Army Artillery Group, Seelbach
 570th U.S. Army Artillery Group, Münster
 2nd Aviation Detachment (10x UH-1H)

Notes

Sources
 
 
 :de:Gliederung des Feldheeres (Bundeswehr, Heeresstruktur 4)
 
 
 Tanaka World

Further reading
 Robinson, Colin, The 1st Canadian Division and the Canadian Forces Joint Operations Group, 1989-2000
 

Structures of military commands and formations in 1989
NATO
Formations of the NATO Military Command Structure 1952–1994